Chryseobacterium xinjiangense  is a bacterium from the genus Chryseobacterium. It has been isolated from the alpine permafrost of the Tianshan Mountains in China.

References

Further reading 
 
 

xinjiangense
Bacteria described in 2011